Jesse M. Shapiro is an American economist and academic. He is the George Gund Professor of Economics and Business Administration at Harvard University, having previously held the George S. and Nancy B. Parker Professorship at Brown University. In 2021, Shapiro was awarded a MacArthur Fellowship.

Education and career 
Shapiro was valedictorian of Stuyvesant High School in 1997. He holds a PhD (2005) in Economics, an MA (2001) in Statistics and a BA (2001) in Economics, all from Harvard University.

Shapiro has published a number of influential papers in the area of industrial organization, political economy and behavioral economics. He has written about obesity in the United States.  Recently his research has focused on polarization in the media and in political opinions.

Before joining the Brown faculty, he was an inaugural Becker Fellow at the Becker Center on Chicago Price Theory and the Chookaszian Family Professor of Economics at the University of Chicago Booth School of Business.

In 2008, The Economist listed Shapiro as one of the top 8 young economists in the world. In 2021, he was named a MacArthur Fellow for "devising new frameworks of analysis to advance understanding of media bias, ideological polarization, and the efficacy of public policy interventions."

Selected works
 Cutler, David M., Edward L. Glaeser, and Jesse M. Shapiro. "Why have Americans become more obese?." Journal of Economic perspectives 17, no. 3 (2003): 93-118.
 Gentzkow, Matthew, and Jesse M. Shapiro. "What drives media slant? Evidence from US daily newspapers." Econometrica 78, no. 1 (2010): 35-71.
 Shapiro, Jesse M. "Smart cities: quality of life, productivity, and the growth effects of human capital." The review of economics and statistics 88, no. 2 (2006): 324-335.
 Gentzkow, Matthew, and Jesse M. Shapiro. "Media bias and reputation." Journal of political Economy 114, no. 2 (2006): 280-316.
 Gentzkow, Matthew, Jesse M. Shapiro, and Michael Sinkinson. "The effect of newspaper entry and exit on electoral politics." American Economic Review 101, no. 7 (2011): 2980-3018.
 Gentzkow, Matthew, and Jesse M. Shapiro. "Ideological segregation online and offline." The Quarterly Journal of Economics 126, no. 4 (2011): 1799-1839.

Personal life
Shapiro is the son of Joyce and Arvin Shapiro. He married economist Emily Oster, in June 2006, and they have two children.

References

External links
 Jesse Shapiro main page
 Curriculum Vitae

Brown University faculty
Harvard University alumni
Living people
Date of birth missing (living people)
Year of birth uncertain
Fellows of the Econometric Society
21st-century American economists
Journal of Political Economy editors
Year of birth missing (living people)